Sree Bhushan Raju M.D., D.M., Diplomate of National Board, (Telugu: శ్రీ భూషణ్ రాజు) is a nephrologist from Telangana, India. He is currently professor and head, Dept of Nephrology, Nizam's Institute of Medical Sciences Panjagutta, Hyderabad. Which is one of the largest teaching Department in India having eight DM seats. He is one of the principal investigators of CKD task force by Indian Council of Medical Research (ICMR) to evaluate the prevalence of CKD in adult urban population in India.

Early life and education
Sree Bhushan Raju was born in Vanaparthi village in a lower-middle-class background family. This village is located at Bhongir mandal of Nalgonda district of Telangana. He had his primary schooling in DVM high school, Nalgonda. He joined in AP Residential College (APRJC), Nagarjuna sagar. He joined Gandhi Medical College, Hyderabad to study MBBS in 1988. He was awarded various gold medals for his academic excellence during his MBBS degree. He secured a top rank in All India competitive examination and joined the Nizam's Institute of Medical Sciences, Hyderabad to pursue his MD (Gen. Medicine) for his post-graduation in 1998. Later he joined the prestigious All India Institute of Medical Sciences, New Delhi, India and completed the D.M. in nephrology. Soon after he joined as faculty in NIMS in July, 2002. He also got DNB in nephrology in which he received the gold medal. Later, he finished MBA in health care management from ICFAI. His main areas of interest are clinical nephrology, CAPD, and CRRT. He was also served as elected NIMS faculty association president.

Career
Sree Bhushan Raju has been working as head of the department of nephrology at NIMS since 2013. During his tenure peritoneal Dialysis and Kidney transplantation program has geared up in NIMS Hospital. The live related renal transplantation escalated from few to more than 100 per year, Nephrology Dept has adequately utilized Jeevandhan program of Telangana and increased its cadaver transplantation significantly.

He, along with several of his students, presented several scientific papers in various national and international conferences. He received the best  paper award from Japanese Society of Dialysis Therapy in 2007. His scientific papers were published in Lancet (Global Burden of Disease), Nephrology Dialysis Transplantation (NDT), Nephrology (Carlton), American Journal of Nephrology, Hemodialysis International, Indian Journal of Nephrology, JAPI, etc. He is one of the principal investigators of CREDENCE, TESTING and ACHIEVE trials and several other clinical trials. He was one of the principal investigators of CKD task force to study the prevalence of CKD in India done by ICMR. International Society of Nephrology recognized him as Educational Ambassador and Mentor in Mentor - Mentee Programme.

He was in the Governing Council member of Indian Society of Nephrology (ISN), Indian Society of Organ Transplantation (ISOT), Peritoneal Dialysis Society of India (PDSI), ISN Southern chapter, Indian Academy of Nephrology (IAN). He was elected as the hon Secretary of Indian Society of Peritoneal Dialysis (PDSI) in 2019. He is reviewer for several peer-reviewed journals and in the editorial board of several journals. He is presently the associate editor of Indian Journal of Nephrology. He is one of the collaborators for “ Global Burden of Disease” (GBD)  from India. He is the examiner for DM (Nephrology) students of several universities in India as well as the National Board of Examinations.  He was the organizing secretary of national conferences like IANCON  in 2011 and ISOTCON in 2018 besides organising several CMES and workshops. He was selected as the academic senate member of Mahatma Gandhi University, Nalgonda and  PhD Committee member of Rajiv Gandhi university, Bangalore, Karnataka.

He is a prolific speaker and delivered lectures in many conferences of nephrology and medicine. He also regularly participate in panel discussion on various TV channels like Doordarshan, Tv9, ETV, NTV et and All India Radio. He writes columns to the newspapers like Eenadu and Mana Telangana. He is a regular writer in popular print media and quoted extensively on various kidney diseases through electronic media.

He delivered several talks on many YouTube channels on topics related to heath and diseases. He has delivered many talks on various channels during COVID-19 pandemic much to the appreciation of Telugu-speaking people all over the world. IMA headquarters from Delhi awarded him the Corona warrior award on the occasion of Doctors Day in 2020.

Awards and recognition
 Prof H.L Trivedi Gold Medal In Nephrology - 2002
 FICP : Indian College of Physicians Association of Physicians of India, January 2012
 FIACM : Fellowship of Indian Association of Clinical Medicine (IACM), October 2012
 MNAMS : Member National Academy of Medical Sciences
 FISN : Fellowship of Indian Society of Nephrology (ISN), December 2012.
 FISOT : Fellowship of Indian Society of Organ Transplantation 2017
 FASN : Fellowship of American Society of Nephrology 2019
 FACP : Fellowship of American College of Physicians
 Meritorius University Teacher Award form Govt of Telangana in 2017
 Corona Warrior by Indian Medical Association (IMA) 2020

publications
 
Post renal transplant diabetes mellitus and hepatitis C: Is there any association. Raju DSB, Agarwal SK, Gupta S, Dash SC, Bhowmick D, Tiwari SC, Guleria S, Mehta SN. Presented as poster in Congress Asian Society of Transplantation (CAST), 2002 held at New Delhi.
 Post-transplant hypertension at one year: Impact on long-term graft survival. Raju DSB, Agarwal SK, Gupta S, Dash SC, Bhowmick D, Tiwari SC, Guleria S, Mehta SN. Presented as poster in Congress Asian society of Transplantation (CAST), 2002 held at New Delhi.
Prevalence of CRF in India. Agarwal SK, Dash SC, Raju DSB, Irshad M. Presented in racial and ethnic minority groups, official satellite conference in the world congress of Nephrology, 18–20 October 2001, Santaffi, USA.
Prevalence of chronic renal failure in adults in Delhi, India. Agarwal SK, Dash SC, Irshad M, Raju S, Singh R, Pandey RM, Nephrol Dial Transplant. 2005 Aug; 20 (8): 1638–42.
Rituximab in the treatment of refractory late acute antibody-mediated rejection: Our initial experience. Surendra M, Raju SB, Raju N, Chandragiri S, Mukku KK, Uppin MS. Indian J Nephrol. 2016 Sep;26(5):317-321
Revisiting renal amyloidosis with clinicopathological characteristics, grading, and scoring: A single-institutional experience. Kalle A, Gudipati A, Raju SB, Kalidindi K, Guditi S, Taduri G, Uppin MS.J Lab Physicians. 2018 Apr-Jun;10(2):226-231.
Management of statin intolerance. Raju SB, Varghese K, Madhu K. Indian J Endocrinol Metab. 2013 Nov;17(6):977-82. doi: 10.4103/2230-8210.122602

References

External links

Telugu people
Living people
Medical doctors from Telangana
Indian cardiologists
People from Nalgonda district
All India Institute of Medical Sciences, New Delhi alumni
Year of birth missing (living people)